Colonel James Hamilton (died 1673) was the son of an Irish army officer and became a courtier to Charles II after the Restoration. He appears in the Mémoires du Comte de Grammont, written by his brother Anthony. The king appointed him ranger of Hyde Park and a groom of his bedchamber. In 1673 Hamilton lost a leg in a sea-fight with the Dutch and died from the wound a few days later. In 1701 his eldest son succeeded a cousin as 6th Earl of Abercorn.

Birth and origins 
James was born in the 1630s in Ireland. He was the eldest son of George Hamilton and his wife Mary Butler. His father was Scottish, the fourth son of James Hamilton, 1st Earl of Abercorn, and would in 1660 be created baronet of Donalong and Nenagh.

James's mother was the third daughter of Thomas Butler, Viscount Thurles and a sister of the future 1st Duke of Ormond. Her family, the Butler dynasty, was Old English and descended from Theobald Walter, who had been appointed Chief Butler of Ireland by King Henry II in 1177. His parents had married in 1629. He had five brothers and three sisters, who are listed in his father's article.

James's parents have often been confused with another George Hamilton, married with another Mary Butler. These are his father's uncle Sir George Hamilton of Greenlaw and Roscrea and his wife Mary, sixth daughter of Walter Butler, 11th Earl of Ormond. This other George Hamilton lived in Roscrea.

Both his parents were Catholic, but some relatives on his father's as on his mother's side were Protestants. His grandfather, James Hamilton, 1st Earl of Abercorn, had been a Protestant, but his father and all his paternal uncles were raised as Catholics due to the influence of his paternal grandmother, Marion Boyd, a Scottish recusant. Some branches of the Hamilton family were Protestant, such as that of his father's second cousin Gustavus (1642–1723), who would become the 1st Viscount Boyne. His mother's family, the Butlers, were generally Catholic with the notable exception of the future 1st Duke of Ormond, his maternal uncle. He himself would later turn Protestant as will be seen below. His brother Thomas seems to have made the same choice as he became a captain in the Royal Navy.

Irish wars and exile 
His father served in the Irish army under his brother-in-law James Butler, Earl of Ormond, in the Irish Confederate Wars (1641–1648) and the Cromwellian conquest of Ireland (1649–1653). It has long been believed that James, aged about 16 or 17, his mother and siblings lived in Roscrea, County Tipperary, and were spared when on 17 September 1646, the Confederate Ulster army under Owen O'Neill captured Roscrea Castle from the Munster confederates and killed everybody else in the castle. This confusion was already made by Carte (1737) and repeated by later authors.

On 28 July 1647 Ormond abandoned Dublin to the parliamentarians and left Ireland. In 1648 Phelim O'Neill stormed Nenagh taking it for O'Neill and Rinuccini, but it was still in the same year recaptured by Inchiquin, who was now allied with the royalists. What role James and his father played in these events is not known.

In 1650, his father was governor of Nenagh Castle when the Parliamentarian army under Henry Ireton attacked and captured the castle on the way back from the unsuccessful siege of Limerick to their winter quarters at Kilkenny.

Early in 1651, when he was about 21, his family followed Ormond into French exile. They first went to Caen where they were accommodated for some time by Elizabeth Preston, the Marchioness of Ormond. He seems then to have been employed at Charles II's wandering exile court in some ways, whereas his mother went to Paris, where she lived in the convent of the Feuillantines, together with her sister Eleanor Butler, Lady Muskerry.

Restoration 
James returned with his parents and siblings from France to London in 1660 with the advent of the English Restoration. They were now well connected at court. His father was created Baronet Donalong in 1660 by Charles II.

Hyde Park 
James was appointed ranger of Hyde Park on 19 September 1660 following the death, on 13 September 1660, of Henry, Duke of Gloucester, the king's brother, who had held this office. While a ranger, he built a partial enclosure of Hyde Park and re-stocked with deer.

He was given a triangular piece of ground at the southeast corner of the park where the street called Hamilton Place, named after him, is now. During the Interregnum buildings were erected for the first time between what is now Old Regent Street and Hyde Park Corner. After the Restoration they were leased to James Hamilton. A new lease of 99 years would be obtained by Elizabeth, his widow, in 1692.

Courtier 
James was known for his fine manners, his elegant dress, and his gallantry. His brother, Anthony Hamilton, describes him in the Mémoires du comte de Grammont as follows (translated by Horace Walpole):
The elder of the Hamiltons, their cousin, was the man who of all the court dressed best: he was well made in his person, and possessed those happy talents which lead to fortune, and procure success in love: he was a most assiduous courtier, had the most lively wit, the most polished manners and the most punctual attention for his master imaginable: no person danced better, nor was any one a more general lover: a merit of some account in a court entirely devoted to love and gallantry.

An admirer of the Countess of Chesterfield, his first cousin, he carried on a romance with her by turning her husband's suspicion on the Duke of York, the future King James II, only to discover that York was courting her as well.

Marriage and children 
The king himself obtained for him the hand of Elizabeth, daughter of John Colepeper, 1st Baron Colepeper, one of the maids of honour to Mary, the Princess Royal. As the bride was a Protestant, he changed religion just before the marriage, which took place in 1661. His mother, a devout Catholic had in vain tried to dissuade him.

 
James and Elizabeth had three sons:
James (c. 16611734), succeeded a second cousin as the 6th Earl of Abercorn
George (died 1692), became a colonel in the foot guards and fell in the Battle of Steenkerque
William (after 1662 – 1737), married his cousin Margaret Colepeper and became the ancestor of the Hamiltons of Chilston

Later life, death, succession, and timeline 
His conversion opened him a career in the English Army. He was appointed colonel of a regiment of foot. Compliance avoided him problems similar to those experienced by his younger brother George, who was dismissed from the Life Guards in 1667 due to his religion and then took French service. Anthony and Richard, the third and the fifth of the brothers, followed George into French service.

He was appointed groom of the bedchamber on 28 October 1664, taking the place of Daniel O'Neill who had died on 24 October.

He was elected to the House of Commons of the Parliament of Ireland for the Constituency of Strabane and sat as Member of Parliament (M.P.) in Chichester House  between 3 July and 7 August 1666.

On 21 August 1667 he was appointed Provost Marshal-General of Barbados. This was a sinecure, which provided him an income without any duty. He never travelled to the island.

He was killed in the Third Anglo-Dutch War. One of his legs was hit by a cannonball on 3 June 1673 when the ship on which he and his regiment were embarked came under fire from the Dutch. He died three days later, on 6 June 1673, of the consequences of this wound. The incident happened four days before the first Battle of Schooneveld, which was fought on 7 June 1673. He was buried on 7 June in Westminster Abbey where his uncle James Butler, 1st Duke of Ormond, erected a monument to his memory. His wife died in 1709.

Despite being the eldest son, he never inherited his father's titles and land as his father outlived him by six years. However, on 2 December 1701 his eldest son, James, on the death of a second cousin, the last heir-male of the main line of the Abercorns, became the 6th Earl of Abercorn.

Notes and References

Notes

Citations

Sources 

 
 
  – 1643 to 1660
  – Marriages, baptisms and burials from about 1660 to 1875
 
 
  – Ab-Adam to Basing
 
  – England
  – Scotland and Ireland
  – (for timeline)
  – 1660 to 1661
 
 
  
 
  
 
 
  
 
  – 1 April 1661 to 31 December 1662
  – Abercorn to Balmerino
  
 
 
  – 1643 to 1685
  – Westminster and the western suburbs
 
  – 1643 to 1660 and index

External links 

The lost Settlement of Dunnalong
Robert O. Bucholz Database of Court Officers 1660 – 1837 Loyola University of Chicago

1630s births
1673 deaths
Burials at Westminster Abbey
Cavaliers
English army officers
Heirs apparent who never acceded
Military personnel of the Anglo-Dutch Wars
Year of birth uncertain